Ronald Lázaro García Justiniano, nicknamed "Nacho" (born 17 December 1980) is a Bolivian former footballer who played as a midfielder. He currently holds the position of Sports Director at Bolivian club Oriente Petrolero.

He "graduated" from Bolivia's famous football academy Tahuichi  Aguilera located in Santa Cruz, which produced some popular Bolivian football stars, including Erwin "Platiní" Sanchez, Marco Antonio "El Diablo" Etcheverry and Jaime Moreno among others.

Club career

Pre-Aris career
García's first professional Bolivian club was Bolívar from La Paz.  From there, he moved to Alverca in Portugal. He played for 3 years there and 2 stories about him are interesting:
First, at some point in his younger age, he was considered and positioned in the top 50 of world's football potentials.
Second, the story with him is related to his days in Benfica.

After his days in Portugal he returned once again to play in Bolivia. During his second spell at Bolívar he reached the quarter finals of the Copa Libertadores, only to be defeated by Club América on 25 May 2000. His notable performances earned him a second chance at his European dream and signed for, which at the time was in the second division, Aris Thessaloniki FC (apparent fee was 100,000 euros).

Aris
In most of his first season with them he was plagued by several problems.  First, his adapting process lasted longer than expected. Second, his from-time-to-time injuries and his longer recoveries, made it difficult for him to become a regular starter. Towards the end of the second division season he gradually started to gain confidence and trust by his coach Nikos Anastopoulos.  As a result of a strong campaign from Aris, Nacho along with Aris were promoted to the first division after just 1 year.

In the big "roster sweeping" summer 2006, Aris Management gave him another chance and left him in the team for the 2006–2007 season.  The first 2/3 of the season were more or less successful.  However, his career continued to hampered with injuries. He was a regular starter under Guillermo Hoyos, the first coach of rebuilding 2006/07 Aris. Lost his starting 11 place to Ruben Palazuelos under Enrique Hernandez (Hoyos' successor).

In mid-August 2008, after a lengthy series of negotiations, García finally signed a 5-year contract extension (up to 2013), earning 2 million euros, in total, for 5 years.

After a year he returned to Aris with less money in September 2011. His first unofficial appearance with the black and yellow shirt was in the friendly against Doxa Dramas on September,4 in which he had a notable performance. García is the club's longest-serving non-Greek player in club history.

Post-Aris career
In July 2010 he was loaned out to Cypriot club Anorthosis Famagusta F.C., and later that year he returned to Bolívar for a third spell. After his contract expired with Aris, García was signed by hometown club Oriente Petrolero in June 2012. A series of troublesome injuries forced him to retire from professional football in May 2015.

International career
In the period of his first season at Aris (and even earlier, but not that often) Nacho was always knocking on the Bolivia national team's door and its starting 11. Finally in 2007, he was capped by the Bolivia National team playing for Copa America 2007 (equivalent to the Euro Cup). In 2007/08 season he finally became an essential, irreplaceable part and core of the Bolivia national team and Aris Thessaloniki. Now, Garcia is considered as one of Bolivia's and Aris FC's top and most consistent stars.

In the September round of the World Cup qualifiers for South Africa 2010, he achieved a great performance leading his national team to a historic 0:0 draw at Brazil, being one of the best men on the field as Bolivian and the "wider" media were reporting.
A month later, at the October pair of matches helped his national team improve their qualifying group position scoring a goal in a 3:0 win over Peru at home and playing again decently in the 3-day later match with Uruguay (2:2). Half a year later (on 1 April), was again a  participant in yet another historic result for his country as Bolivia thrashed Argentina 6:1, in La Paz, noting an assist on his match stats account. Between 2002 and 2013 García earned a total of 48 caps for the national team and scored 2 goals. He represented his country in 28 FIFA World Cup qualification matches.

Career statistics

Scores and results list Bolivia's goal tally first, score column indicates score after each García goal.

References

External links 
 
 

1980 births
Living people
Sportspeople from Santa Cruz de la Sierra
Association football midfielders
Bolivian footballers
Bolivia international footballers
Club Bolívar players
F.C. Alverca players
Aris Thessaloniki F.C. players
Anorthosis Famagusta F.C. players
Oriente Petrolero players
Bolivian Primera División players
Primeira Liga players
Super League Greece players
Cypriot First Division players
Bolivian expatriate footballers
Expatriate footballers in Portugal
Expatriate footballers in Greece
Expatriate footballers in Cyprus
Bolivian expatriate sportspeople in Portugal
2001 Copa América players
2007 Copa América players
2011 Copa América players